On May 20, 2008, an election was held in Portland, Oregon, to elect the mayor.. Sam Adams was elected, defeating challenger Sho Dozono. Incumbent mayor Tom Potter did not seek a second term.

Portland uses a nonpartisan system for local elections, in which all voters are eligible to participate. All candidates are listed on the ballot without any political party affiliation.

Candidates competed in a blanket primary election on May 20, 2008. Because Sam Adams received an absolute majority of the vote in the primary election, no run-off election was held.

Candidates
 David "The Ack" Ackerman, dishwasher and photographer
 Sam Adams, City Commissioner
 Bruce Broussard, business owner
 Kyle Burris
 Vladislav S. "Slav" Davidzon, entrepreneur (withdrawn)
 Sho Dozono, businessman
 Steven Entwisle, activist
 Bob Leonard Forthan
 Craig Gier, engineer
 Lew Humble, retired mechanic
 James Bernard Lee, retired researcher
 Beryl Sylvia McNair
 Nick Popenuk (withdrew)
 Christopher Rich
 Patricia Stuart
 Jeff Taylor, former West Linn Budget Committee member
 Gerhard Watzig, program manager (withdrew)

Polling

Results

References

Mayoral election 2008
2008
2008 Oregon elections
Portland, Oregon